Larry Glover is an American sportscaster, and is the former play-by-play voice of the South Atlantic League's Lexington Legends. He served as the team's Director of Broadcasting and Media Relations during his time with the team, and in addition was the team's official scorer. He is best known as the 2005 South Atlantic League Media Relations Director of the Year.

A native of Hawesville, Kentucky and an alumnus of the University of Kentucky, Glover began his broadcasting career when he correctly picked Duke to defeat Kentucky in the 1992 Elite Eight, thus winning a contest on a Lexington, Kentucky sports radio program. He was permitted to host his own show as a result, and eventually came to pilot Sunday Sports Central, a post he held for more than nine years. He resides in Lexington, Kentucky with his wife, Laura.

Glover currently hosts Larry Glover Live weeknights on 590, WVLK in Lexington and 1450, The Sports Buzz.  The show is streamed live on www.larrygloverlive.com in addition to Sunday Sports Central on Sunday mornings on the same station.

References

External links
His official website
Larry's Call of the Joe Mikulik Meltdown

American radio sports announcers
University of Kentucky alumni
Year of birth missing (living people)
Living people
People from Hancock County, Kentucky
Radio personalities from Kentucky